Hugh Nerlien is a Canadian politician, who was elected to the Legislative Assembly of Saskatchewan in the 2016 provincial election. He represents the electoral district of Kelvington-Wadena, as a member of the Saskatchewan Party.

Background 
Nerlien was born in Kelvington, Saskatchewan. He is currently married, and has two sons and one daughter. Nerlien holds a diploma in business administration from Saskatchewan Polytechnic, and prior to election to the Legislature worked in the banking sector.

Electoral history

2016 Saskatchewan general election

References

Living people
Saskatchewan Party MLAs
21st-century Canadian politicians
People from Kelvington, Saskatchewan
Year of birth missing (living people)